Michael Peter Olsen (born June 28, 1974) is a Grammy-nominated multi-instrumentalist, producer, engineer, composer and arranger currently based in Toronto, Ontario.

Olsen has collaborated live on tour and on records with bands and artists such as Arcade Fire,  Drake, K-OS, Jim Guthrie, Kevin Hearn, The Constantines, Gentleman Reg, Great Lake Swimmers The Hidden Cameras. and Zoon.

He is also well known as a producer and has worked with Ohbijou, and Spiral Beach. Olsen was a founder and operator of the Toronto recording studio Uncomfortable Silence.

Olsen currently fronts the Toronto band Our Founders, whose members include Spencer Cole of Weaves. Their album The Nines was released in October 2013.

He was a Canadian Film Centre Slaight Music Lab Resident from 2014 to 2015 in Toronto.

As a solo artist, Olsen released a full-length record titled "Yearning Flow" in the spring of 2021 on the Canadian independent label Hand Drawn Dracula

Selected performance discography

Drake
 Views (2016)

Our Founders
 The Nines (2013)

The Great Lake Swimmers
 Ongiara (2007)
 Lost Channels (2009)

Arcade Fire
 Funeral (2004)
 Cold Wind (2005)
 Dark Was the Night (2009)

Hidden Cameras
 The Hidden Cameras Play the CBC Sessions (2002)
 The Smell of Our Own (2003)
 A Miracle (2003)
 Mississauga Goddam (2004)
 Awoo (2006)
 Origin:Orphan (2009)

K-os
 Joyful Rebellion (2004)

Jim Guthrie
 Now, More Than Ever (2003)
 Morning Noon Night (2003)

Selected production discography

Ohbijou
 Swift Feet for Troubling Times (2006), Producer/Engineer

Spiral Beach
 Ball (Sparks/EMI, 2007), Co-Producer/Engineer
 The Bonus Disc (Sparks/EMI, 2008), Producer/Engineer
 The Only Really Thing (Sparks/EMI, 2009), Producer/Engineer

The Organ
 The Organ (Mint Records/604, 2008), Mix Engineer

References

External links
 Michael Peter Olsen
 Facebook
 Our Founders

Living people
1974 births
Canadian people of Danish descent
The Hidden Cameras members